Futbolo klubas Sveikata, commonly known as Sveikata, is a Lithuanian football club located in Kybartai, in Vilkaviškis District. They currently play in the II Lyga, the third tier of Lithuanian football.
They are the oldest active football club in the country.  In 2019 FK Sveikata became a member of the prestigious Club of Pioneers.

History
The club was founded in as FK Banga Kybartai. The following year it was renamed and called FK Sveikata Kybartai.

In 1949, the club became a part of the republican sports union "Žalgiris". From 1952, the club was renamed GKS for sponsorship reasons. 

During the Soviet occupation in Lithuania, the club was in the top division for a long time. Over the decades, it was both relegated and promoted back to the first tier more than once.

The 1990 season saw the club relegated to the First League and subsequently, in 1993, to the Second League.

Currently (2022), they play in II Lyga. In 2019, they had hope obtain a licence for Pirma lyga (2nd tier).

Name
Sveikata in Lithuanian means health.

The club was named Sveikata for the first time in 1920. Following a series of name changes, it was renamed Sveikata  in 1973.

Historical names
 1919 – Banga
 1920 – Sveikata
 1949 – Žalgiris
 1952 – GKS
 1973 – Sveikata

Honours
 The club's honours in soviet occupation period: played in "A" klasė (top division) or "B" klasė (second tier).
 In the period following Lithuanian independence (since 1990), Sveikata was in the first tier for one season, in the second tier for three seasons, and currently play in the third tier. 
 Never champions of the country, Sveikata have twice been runners-up in the third tier, in 2000 and 2016.

Domestic
In recent seasons the team plays in the II Lyga Southern Zone championship.

 II Lyga Southern Zone
 Runners-up - 2: 2000, 2016

Post Independence

Kit evolution

Colors
Blue and red.

Stadium
Sveikata play their home matches in Kybartai Stadium. The current capacity of the stadium is 500 seats.

Current squad

References

External links
 sveikat.lt (of.)
 lietuvosfutbolas.lt/klubai/sveikata
 futbolinis.lt
 KAFF
 weltfussballarchiv.com
 Statistics & Info

Association football clubs established in 1919
Football clubs in Lithuania